Deh Dushab (also Romanized as Deh Dūshāb; also known as Deh Dūshābād) is a village in Rudbar-e Shahrestan Rural District, Alamut-e Gharbi District, Qazvin County, Qazvin Province, Iran. At the 2006 census, its population was 146, in 41 families.

References 

Populated places in Qazvin County